The International Fair Play Committee, abbreviated as the CIFP, is a not for profit international non-governmental organisation which serves to foster sportsmanship in international competition. It presents awards annually at the World Fair Play Awards to recognise acts of fair play carried out by sportspeople or teams. The awards ceremony is held in France and has been broadcast on television in Europe.

History

The IFPC was established in France in 1963 by members of UNESCO, International Sports Press Association (ISPA), ICSSPE, FIFA, FIBA, FILA and the International Rugby Board. The committee presented its first award two years later: Eugenio Monti, an Italian bobsleigher, was the recipient. The spare part Monti had given to rival Tony Nash at the 1964 Winter Olympics had enabled the Briton to go on to win the gold medal.

Awards

Since 1965, three types of trophy have been given at the World Fair Play Awards in recognition of different achievements.
Pierre de Coubertin World Fair Play Trophy – awarded for gestures of fair play in which an athlete impedes their own performance to aid a fellow competitor.
Jean Borotra World Fair Play Trophy – awarded to recognise athletes who have displayed fair play throughout their careers
Willi Daume World Fair Play Trophy – awarded to a person or organisation that has promoted the spirit of fair play

Further to these annual trophies, the CIFP gives out diplomas and letters of congratulations to other sportspeople and organisations who have shown exceptional good sportsmanship.

Presidents
Since 2000, Jenő Kamuti has served as the CIFP president.
Honorary Presidents
Jean Borotra, CIFP founder
Koïchiro Matsuura, director-general of UNESCO
Michael Morris, 3rd Baron Killanin, past president of the IOC
Juan Antonio Samaranch, past president of the IOC
Jacques Rogge, past president of the IOC

See also
Pierre de Coubertin medal (awarded by IOC)
FIFA Fair Play Award
Jean Borotra Sportsmanship Award
Lady Byng Memorial Trophy

References

External links

International organizations based in France
International sports organizations
Sports organizations established in 1963
Sportsmanship